The Feminicides of the cotton field is the media name for murders committed by two Mexican serial killers, Edgar Ernesto Álvarez Cruz and José Francisco Granados de la Paz (born 1979). Both were active between 1993 and 2003, in the city of Ciudad Juárez. According to his own statements, Granados kidnapped, tortured, raped and murdered at least 8-10 young women, but according to the Attorney General of the State of Chihuahua they murdered at least 14 women. This corresponded to the 8 corpses found in cotton fields in the city's outskirts and 6 more found in Mount Cerro Negro, also adjacent to the city.

Background

Apprehension of Francisco Granados 
Granados was an assiduous consumer of cocaine, had a long criminal record in the United States, consisting mainly of low-impact crimes such as illegal entry and residence in the country and consumption and possession of illicit substances; there are records that indicate that Francisco's first arrest was made in 1995, when he was 16 years old, on charges of illegal stay in the country and resisting arrest.

In 2003, he was detained by the police in El Paso, Texas, the Texas Ranger Division, under the charge of illegal stay in the country.

Confessions 
While in the custody of the Texas police in 2006, Granados confessed to having participated in at least 10 murders of women, perpetrated between 1993 and 2003. In his statements he indicated that he was not fully aware of what he did, as he committed his crimes while drugged:

He identified Edgar Ernesto Álvarez Cruz as the alleged mastermind of between 10 and 17 murders. He also mentioned of the participation of a third man,  Alejandro Delgado Valles, known as El Calas, who was later exonerated. He indicated that Álvarez used to provide him drugs during the crimes, so he did not remember the exact events.

Crimes 
According to statements by Francisco Granados, the women were kidnapped or taken with deception to unpopulated areas of the outskirts of the city inside Álvarez's car, an eighties-model Renault, where they were tied and raped, then mutilated and murdered in the midst of satanistic rituals chaired by Álvarez, who used to dissect the hearts of his victims. The bodies were buried or simply abandoned in vacant lots, with some buried in Álvarez's own home. In later investigations, a corpse was exhumed on the premises of Álvarez's home.

Possible victims 
In his confession Granados identified 6 murdered women, and mentioned a sixth and seventh victim whom he partially identified only under their supposed names:
 Mayra Juliana Reyes Solís
 Esmeralda Herrera Monrreal
 Laura Berenice Ramos Mónarrez
 Claudia Ivette González
 Verónica Martínez Hernández
 Guadalupe Luna de la Rosa
 Rosario ("Chayito"): she supposedly died when she was intentionally run over by Álvarez with his car.

Court proceedings

Intervention of the Inter-American Court of Human Rights 
The intervention of the Inter-American Court of Human Rights was based on requests from victims' relatives, who filed a complain against the Mexican State, motivated by the lack of response from the same.

In 2005 the Inter-American Court approved and admitted the case, and in January 2007 it accumulated the files of González, Monrreal and Mónarrez, whose bodies were found in Juárez's cotton fields.

On November 16, 2009, the court issued a judgment against the Mexican State.

From the sentence that was issued the following recommendations were highlighted:
 Conduct the criminal process properly
 Publicly acknowledge their international responsibility
 Unveil a monument in memory of the victims

See also 
 Belém do Pará Convention § Impact 
 Female homicides in Ciudad Juárez
 The Ciudad Juárez Rebels
 Abdul Latif Sharif

References 

1993 murders in Mexico
1990s murders in Mexico
2000s murders in Mexico 
21st-century mass murder in Mexico
20th-century mass murder in Mexico
2003 murders in Mexico
Crimes involving Satanism or the occult
Incidents of violence against women
Male serial killers
Mexican rapists
Mexican serial killers
Murder in Mexico
Rape in Mexico
Violence against women in Mexico